Softronic Transmontana is a six-axle electric locomotive for freight trains, produced by the Romanian locomotive producer Softronic.

History
The first machine of this type was delivered in 2010.

Users
It is used for freight train operation by operators based in Austria, Hungary, Romania, Sweden, Slovakia.

CFR Calatori also owns one unit, using it regularly on InterRegio trains. In 2021, one of its pantographs was replaced, now having one Schunk pantograph (replaced) and a classic Softronic Stemann pantograph.

References

Standard gauge locomotives of Austria
Standard gauge locomotives of Hungary
Standard gauge locomotives of Romania
Standard gauge locomotives of Sweden
15 kV AC locomotives
25 kV AC locomotives
Co′Co′ locomotives
Electric locomotives of Romania
Electric locomotives of Sweden
Co′Co′ electric locomotives of Europe